The Orange Blossom Classic is an annual college football game first held between 1933 and 1978 and again since 2021. In its first incarnation, it featured Florida A&M and another historically black school in an unofficial de facto championship game. It was seen as a mythical "Black National Championship" game. For example, the December 5, 1942, Afro American newspaper refers to the 1942 game as a national title game, as does at least one source for the 1945 game.

In its second incarnation, Florida A&M played Jackson State in a season opening game at Hard Rock Stadium in September 2021.

Game results

1933–1978

2021–present

Appearances by school

Footnotes

See also
List of black college football classics

References

Recurring sporting events established in 1933
Recurring events disestablished in 1978
Defunct college football bowls
Florida A&M Rattlers football
1933 establishments in Florida
Black college football classics